The Frauen DFB-Pokal 1985–86 was the 6th season of the cup competition, Germany's second-most important title in women's football. In the final which was held in Berlin on 3 May 1986 TSV Siegen defeated SSG Bergisch Gladbach 2–0, thus winning their first national title.

Participants

First round

Replay

Quarter-finals

Semi-finals

Final

See also 

 1985–86 DFB-Pokal men's competition

References 

Fra
DFB-Pokal Frauen seasons